The 2011 season is the 32nd season of competitive football in Comoros.

National teams 
The home team or the team that is designated as the home team is listed in the left column; the away team is in the right column.

Senior

2012 Africa Cup of Nations qualification

2011 Indian Ocean Island Games

Comoros Premier League

Comorian clubs in international competitions

Elan Club

References
 Fifa - Comoros Association
 Comoros tables at Soccerway
 Comoros national team at Soccerway

Comoros
Seasons in Comorian football